Daniel Brook Bartlett (February 22, 1937 – January 21, 2000) was a United States district judge of the United States District Court for the Western District of Missouri.

Education and career

Born and raised in Kansas City, Missouri, Bartlett graduated from the Pembroke Country-Day School in 1955, and received a Bachelor of Arts degree from Princeton University in 1959 and a Bachelor of Laws from Stanford Law School in 1962. He was in private practice in Kansas City from 1962 to 1969, after which he served in the office of the Missouri Attorney General until 1977, first as an assistant attorney general until 1973 and then as first assistant Attorney General. From 1977 to 1981, he was in private practice in Kansas City.

Federal judicial service

On July 9, 1981, President Ronald Reagan nominated Bartlett to be a federal judge on the United States District Court for the Western District of Missouri in Kansas City, for a seat vacated by Judge John Watkins Oliver. The United States Senate confirmed Bartlett on September 16, 1981, and he received his commission on September 19, 1981. Between 1995 and 2000, he served as Chief Judge.

Death

He died of multiple myeloma, a form of cancer, in Kansas City, Missouri on January 21, 2000, about three years after he had been diagnosed in January 1997.

References

Sources
 

1937 births
2000 deaths
Deaths from multiple myeloma
Lawyers from Kansas City, Missouri
Judges of the United States District Court for the Western District of Missouri
United States district court judges appointed by Ronald Reagan
20th-century American judges
Stanford Law School alumni
Princeton University alumni
20th-century American lawyers
Deaths from cancer in Kansas